The national flag of the Principality of Andorra features a vertical tricolour of blue, yellow, and red with the coat of arms of Andorra in the center. Although the three vertical bars may at first appear to be of equal width, the centre yellow bar is slightly wider than the other two so that the ratio of bar widths is 8:9:8 with an overall flag ratio of 7:10.

A civilian variant of the flag is said to have been created in 1866, although the design was standardized in 1993 after Andorra joined the United Nations.

History 
The historical flag of Andorra, which was used from 1806 to 1866, featured two equally sized red and yellow vertical (sometimes horizontal) bands. It is claimed that this flag was granted by Napoleon in 1806 but use of the flag may go back to much earlier. A variant of the modern flag without the coat of arms is said to have been designed by Napoleon III, adding a blue stripe representing France (because colours of the old flag started to resemble too much only the new flag of Spain). From 1931 until 1939 a horizontal version of the flag was used which was meant to reflect the Spanish flag. Briefly in July 1934 a horizontal variant with a crown in the middle was flown under the rule of Boris I until his removal from the throne. From 1939 to 1949 a variant of the 1866 flag flew but with a different flag ratio and coat of arms, and following that from 1949 to 1959 a variant with different colors appeared. Multiple versions of the modern flag were flown until 1993 when Andorra standardized their flag with their entry into the United Nations.

Origins and symbolism
The design is related to the flags of Catalonia, Foix and France, the lands historically linked with the small country. The coat of arms of Andorra in the center of the flag contains historical symbolism to Bishop of Urgell, Count of Foix, Catalonia, and the Viscounty of Béarn. The inclusion of the coat of arms makes it one of 28 national flags to contain overtly Christian symbolism and it is the only national flag to portray cattle, except for the flag of Moldova, which features the head of a bull. A flag of three bars is similar to that of the French tricolor, while the pattern of a wider middle stripe can be noted on the Spanish flag. The motto in the coat of arms (written in Goudy Old Style) in the middle stripe  means "Virtue United is Stronger". The blue and red of the Andorran flag are also found on the French flag, with red and yellow also being the colors of the Catalonian flag (as the old royal symbol of the Crown of Aragon) and the arms of the old County of Foix (currently part of France). 

The design is similar to the flags of Romania, Moldova, and Chad. All of these are vertical tricolors of blue, yellow, and red.

Colors

The official colors of the Andorran flag are set out in the "Graphic regulations for reproducing the shield and flag" from the Oficina de Marques del Principat d'Andorra. The colors of the flag are:

Other flags of Andorra

Civil flags

Parish flags

Historical flags

See also

Coat of arms of Andorra

References

External links 

https://www.ompa.ad/images/PDF/normativa-signes/Normes_Grafiques.pdf

1866 introductions
Flag
National flags
Flags introduced in 1866
Flags introduced in 1971
Andorra